Salem, New York is the name of two locations in Washington County, New York in the United States:

 Salem (hamlet), New York 
 Salem (town), New York

See also
 Brocton, New York (formerly named Salem)
 Salem (disambiguation)